This is a list of notable events in country music that took place in the year 1973.

Events
July — The Dean Martin Show becomes known as Dean Martin Presents Music Country for the longtime variety show's summer broadcasts. Country music becomes a staple of Martin's show for the 1973–1974 season — its last on the air, as it turns out.
July 4 — Willie Nelson hosts his first Fourth of July picnic.
July 14 — Billboard increases the number of positions for its Hot Country Singles chart to 100 (up from 75), which it would keep until January 1990. The expansion comes at a time when the number of No. 1 songs in a given year continues to increase; for the first time in history, there are at least 35 No. 1 songs in one year.
September — Jimmy Dean's third country music TV series, The Jimmy Dean Show, premieres in syndication for what will be a two-season run.
October 6 — Country music's most successful syndicated radio countdown program to date, "American Country Countdown," makes its debut. The three-hour program is created by Casey Kasem and Don Bustany, and is modeled after American Top 40 (which Kasem also hosted). Comedian Don Bowman) is the original host, but by 1978, he would be replaced by Bob Kingsley.
October — The new Radio & Records magazine includes a 50-position country singles chart.
November 10 — One of Nashville's most notorious murders makes national headlines when David Akeman (aka Stringbean) and his wife, Estelle, are killed when they interrupt a burglary after returning home. Their bodies are found the next day. Their assailants—brothers John and Marvin Douglas—are later captured, convicted and sentenced to prison. Stringbean, who was 58, was best known to his audiences for his role on the syndicated series "Hee Haw."

Top hits of the year

Number one hits

United States
(as certified by Billboard)

Notes
1^ No. 1 song of the year, as determined by Billboard.
2^ Song dropped from No. 1 and later returned to top spot.
A^ First Billboard No. 1 hit for that artist.
B^ Last Billboard No. 1 hit for that artist.
C^ Only Billboard No. 1 hit for that artist to date.

Canada
(as certified by RPM)

Notes
2^ Song dropped from No. 1 and later returned to top spot.
A^ First RPM No. 1 hit for that artist.
B^ Last RPM No. 1 hit for that artist.
C^ Only RPM No. 1 hit for that artist.

Other major hits

Singles released by American artists

Singles released by Canadian artists

Top new album releases

Other top new albums

Births
 March 6 — Trent Willmon, rising country music star of the early- to mid-2000s (decade).
 May 24 — Jill Johnson, Swedish female country singer.
 June 6 — Lisa Brokop, Canadian country star of the 1990s and early-2000s (decade).
 June 26 — Gretchen Wilson, singer-songwriter and key member of the MuzikMafia of the 2000s (decade).
 July 29 — James Otto, rising male vocalist of the 2000s (decade).
 August 8 — Mark Wills, country star of the mid-to-late-1990s and early-2000s (decade) ("19 Somethin'", "Wish You Were Here").
 August 13 — Andy Griggs, country music star of late-1990s and early-2000s (decade).
 November 19 — Billy Currington, rising star of the mid-2000s (decade).

Deaths
March 26 – Don Messer, 63, Canadian fiddler and folk music icon whose career spanned 40 years (heart attack).
September 19 — Gram Parsons, 26, influential country rock and alt-country singer-songwriter-guitarist who was a member of such bands as The Byrds and The Flying Burrito Brothers, and also recorded a critically acclaimed body of solo recordings (drug overdose).
November 10 — Stringbean, 58, banjo player and comedian on the TV series Hee Haw (homicide).

Country Music Hall of Fame Inductees
Chet Atkins (1924–2001)
Patsy Cline (1932–1963), first female to be inducted as a solo act.

Major awards

Grammy Awards
Best Female Country Vocal Performance — "Let Me Be There", Olivia Newton-John
Best Male Country Vocal Performance —c"Behind Closed Doors", Charlie Rich
Best Country Performance by a Duo or Group with Vocal — "From the Bottle to the Bottom", Kris Kristofferson and Rita Coolidge
Best Country Instrumental Performance — "Dueling Banjos", Eric Weissberg and Steve Mandell
Best Country Song — "Behind Closed Doors", Kenny O'Dell (Performer: Charlie Rich)

Juno Awards
Country Male Vocalist of the Year — Stompin' Tom Connors
Country Female Vocalist of the Year — Shirley Eikhard
Country Group or Duo of the Year — Mercey Brothers

Academy of Country Music
Entertainer of the Year — Roy Clark
Song of the Year — "Behind Closed Doors", Kenny O'Dell (Performer: Charlie Rich)
Single of the Year — "Behind Closed Doors", Charlie Rich
Album of the Year — Behind Closed Doors, Charlie Rich
Top Male Vocalist — Charlie Rich
Top Female Vocalist — Loretta Lynn
Top Vocal Group — Brush Arbor
Top New Male Vocalist — Dorsey Burnette
Top New Female Vocalist — Olivia Newton-John

Country Music Association
Entertainer of the Year — Roy Clark
Song of the Year — "Behind Closed Doors", Kenny O'Dell (Performer: Charlie Rich)
Single of the Year — "Behind Closed Doors", Charlie Rich
Album of the Year — Behind Closed Doors, Charlie Rich
Male Vocalist of the Year — Charlie Rich
Female Vocalist of the Year — Loretta Lynn
Vocal Duo of the Year — Conway Twitty and Loretta Lynn
Vocal Group of the Year — The Statler Brothers
Instrumentalist of the Year — Charlie McCoy
Instrumental Group of the Year — Danny Davis and the Nashville Brass

Further reading
Kingsbury, Paul, The Grand Ole Opry: History of Country Music. 70 Years of the Songs, the Stars and the Stories, Villard Books, Random House; Opryland USA, 1995
Kingsbury, Paul, Vinyl Hayride: Country Music Album Covers 1947–1989, Country Music Foundation, 2003
Millard, Bob, Country Music: 70 Years of America's Favorite Music, HarperCollins, New York, 1993
Whitburn, Joel, Top Country Songs 1944–2005 (6th Edition). 2005.

References
 Brooks, Tim and Earl Marsh. The Complete Directory to Prime Time Network and Cable TV Shows Eighth Ed., Ballantine Books, 2003. 
 Erickson, Hal. Syndicated Television: The First Forty Years, 1947–1987. McFarland & Co. Inc. Publishers, Jefferson, North Carolina, 1989. .
 Hendler, Herb, Year by Year in the Rock Era: Events and Conditions Shaping the Rock Generations That Reshaped America, Greenwood Press, Westport, Connecticut, 1983.

Other links
Country Music Association
Inductees of the Country Music Hall of Fame

External links
Country Music Hall of Fame

Country
Country music by year